Weave Magazine was an American literary magazine based in Pittsburgh. It was established in order to remedy a perceived gender imbalance in contemporary literary publishing. Weave published literary fiction, poetry, nonfiction, reviews and artwork biannually in January and July. The magazine was last published in 2016.

History
Weave  was established by Laura E. Davis and Margaret Bashaar in May 2008. It ensures that at least half of the work in each issue is created by women. Weave'''s vision of diversity has since expanded to feature work by LGBT writers, writers of color, writers of age and disabled writers, among other marginalized voices. Davis served as the editor-in-chief.

 Awards 
The magazine, or pieces that have appeared in it, received the following awards:
 2013 Verse Daily: "Push" by Kate Partridge and "Tantrum" by Suzanne Marie Hopcroft.
 2012 Micro Award Finalist: Anthony Varallo's story, "All Very Surprising", which appeared in Weave'' issue 7.
 2008 Seed Award from The Sprout Fund.

References

External links 
 
 Review of issue 2 at Newpages.com
 Review of issue 6 at Newpages.com

2008 establishments in Pennsylvania
2016 disestablishments in Pennsylvania
Biannual magazines published in the United States
Defunct literary magazines published in the United States
Magazines established in 2008
Magazines disestablished in 2016
Magazines published in Pittsburgh